

Education 
Elias Koutsoupias is a Greek computer scientist working in algorithmic game theory. 

Koutsoupias received his bachelor's degree in electrical engineering from the National Technical University of Athens and his doctorate in computer science in 1994 from the University of California, San Diego under the supervision of Christos Papadimitriou. He subsequently taught at the University of California, Los Angeles, the University of Athens, and is now a professor at the University of Oxford.

Career 
In 2012, he was one of the recipients of the Gödel Prize for his contributions to algorithmic game theory, specifically the introduction of the price of anarchy concept with Papadimitriou in the paper 'Worst-case equilibria'. His work has also spanned complexity theory, design and analysis of algorithms, online algorithms, networks, uncertainty decisions and mathematical economics. In 2019, he gave a lecture on game theory at CERN.

In 2016, Koutsoupias worked with Aggelos Kiayias and Maria Kyropoulou on the paper “Blockchain Mining Games”. He contributed aspects of game theory for stake pools in the Ouroboros consensus protocol. This was used in the Cardano blockchain, and Koutsoupias became a senior research fellow at IOHK, the blockchain engineering company developing Cardano.

Selected publications

References

External links
Homepage

Greek computer scientists
Year of birth missing (living people)
Living people
National and Kapodistrian University of Athens alumni
Greek expatriates in the United States
Academics of the University of Oxford
University of California, Los Angeles faculty
National Technical University of Athens alumni
University of California, San Diego alumni
Game theorists
Gödel Prize laureates
People associated with Cardano